The Emporia State Hornets football program is a college football team that represents Emporia State University in the Mid-America Intercollegiate Athletics Association, a part of NCAA Division II. The team has had 24 head coaches since its first recorded football game in 1893. The current coach is Garin Higgins who first took the position for the 2007 season.

Key

Coaches
Statistics correct as of the end of the 2022 college football season.

See also 

 List of people from Lyon County, Kansas

Notes

References

Lists of college football head coaches
Kansas sports-related lists